Darío Teodoro Muchotrigo Carrillo (born 17 December 1970, in Lima) is a Peruvian retired footballer.

Club career
Muchotrigo played for a number of clubs in Peru, including Alianza Lima and Juan Aurich. He also had spells with Tecos in the Primera División de México and Ionikos in the Greek Super League.

International career
Muchotrigo made 24 appearances for the senior Peru national football team from 1993 to 2001.

References

External links
 
 

1970 births
Living people
Footballers from Lima
Association football forwards
Peruvian footballers
Peru international footballers
1993 Copa América players
2001 Copa América players
Club Alianza Lima footballers
Tecos F.C. footballers
Juan Aurich footballers
Ionikos F.C. players
Estudiantes de Medicina footballers
Charlotte Eagles players
Deportivo Pereira footballers
Club Deportivo Universidad de San Martín de Porres players
Unión Huaral footballers
Peruvian expatriate footballers
Expatriate footballers in Mexico
Peruvian expatriate sportspeople in Mexico
Expatriate footballers in Greece
Expatriate soccer players in the United States
Expatriate footballers in Colombia
Peruvian Primera División players
Liga MX players
Super League Greece players
USL Second Division players
Categoría Primera A players